Make Me is the twentieth book in the Jack Reacher series written by Lee Child. It was initially published on 8 September 2015 by Delacorte Press. The novel is written in the third person.

Plot 
Somewhere in the sprawling, flat, desolate Midwestern United States, Reacher arrives by train at a small town named Mother's Rest, curious as to the story behind the name. He meets a Chinese American woman named Chang who is apparently searching for a lost associate. Thinking that the town may have once been a young mother's delivery site or perhaps the final resting place of an old woman, Reacher wanders the town asking the locals about the name, but he does not learn anything. He decides to befriend Chang, who reveals she is an ex-FBI agent turned private investigator who is looking for her colleague; Keever. Reacher's suspicions are aroused by the aloofness of the locals and he decides to stay in the town to help with Chang's investigations.

Chang explains that she was only recently called in by Keever and does not know the identity of his client or any of the details of his case. Searching Keever's house, Reacher finds a crumpled up note with the name "Maloney" and a phone number. It belongs to a journalist from Los Angeles named Westwood who is the Science Editor and handles calls from conspiracy theorists, which he eventually blocks after numerous calls. He turns out to be a dead end. Reacher and Chang then turn their search to Maloney, believing him to be Keever's contact and a resident of Mother's Rest. As they investigate the town, they are confronted by hostile locals whom Reacher quickly defeats while stealing their handguns.

Reacher and Chang then visit Keever's home, finding it to be ransacked with all of the man's investigative notes missing. Reacher becomes convinced that Keever had stumbled onto something big and been killed for it, and the two decide to go to Los Angeles to meet with Westwood. Convincing the journalist that Keever had been onto something newsworthy, they agree to give Westwood exclusive rights to the story in exchange for his help. Westwood reluctantly agrees and gives Reacher the phone numbers of unknown people who had recently called him and been blocked, thus fitting the profile of Keever's mystery client. They learn that their man Maloney is actually a Chicago resident named Peter McCann.

Arriving at McCann's home, they find he has gone missing. They are then attacked by a hitman named Hackett, who is narrowly incapacitated by Reacher after sustaining moderate injuries. The two then question McCann's neighbor and learn that Peter had a sister. At her home in Phoenix, they are attacked by even more hired assassins. With the help of Chang's FBI contacts, they learn the men are all employed by a Ukrainian crime lord named Merchenko. Reacher deduces that Merchenko is either the mastermind or outside security in the mastermind's employ. The puppet master is apparently someone indigenous to the town of Mother's Rest. By an amazing coincidence, Reacher and Chang happen across Merchenko outside of his club. Reacher righteously executes the criminal in broad daylight.

Traveling back to Los Angeles, Reacher and Chang reunite with Westwood. Going over all that they learned from McCann's sister and neighbor, Reacher posits that Peter was investigating the disappearance of his son, Michael. Michael had suffered from anhedonia and was a recluse who spent the majority of his time on the Internet. As the call from "Maloney" had been about the Deep Web, Reacher, Chang and Westwood meet with an associate of Westwood's, a computer hacker in Palo Alto. Westwood's contact is able to discover that Mother's Rest has a Deep Web site providing assisted euthanasia services. They further find that Michael had been speaking with suicidal persons over the Deep Web and arranged to meet one of them in Mother's Rest to undergo euthanasia together.

Reacher, Chang and Westwood come up with a plan to assault the pig farm outside Mother's Rest which is both highly remote and well-defended. After a mildly challenging, routine job of killing all of the armed employees, Reacher's team discovers that someone had converted the farmhouse into a film production facility. The entrepreneurs had lured in suicidal people over the Deep Web with promises of painlessly luxurious euthanasia services. Once the clients had arrived however, they were actually made the stars of expensive snuff films tailored to the viewer's specifications and sold over the Deep Web. Over two hundred such victims had been brutally murdered prior to Keever stumbling onto it in the course of his investigating Michael's disappearance. Reacher and Chang avenge Keever, Peter, and Michael by killing the last members of the conspiracy. In the aftermath of all that dirty work they decide to spend a little downtime in Milwaukee together.

Review

—Janet Maslin, The New York Times

References

External links

LeeChild's official website
Andy Martin's nonfiction book, Reacher Said Nothing, about the writing of Make Me
Summary of Make Me at WellRead

2015 British novels
English novels
Jack Reacher books
Novels about suicide
British thriller novels
Third-person narrative novels
Bantam Press books